Samir Arora (born November 5, 1965) is an Indian-American businessman and CEO of Kyro since September 2021, the former CEO of Sage Digital from 2016 to 2021, and the former CEO of Mode Media (formerly Glam Media) from 2003 to April 2016. He was CEO and chairman of the web design company NetObjects, Inc. from 1995 to 2001 and at Apple Inc. from 1982 to 1991. Arora was selected as one of the 21 Internet Pioneers that shaped the World Wide Web at the 1st Web Innovators Awards by CNET in 1997.

Early life and education 
Samir Arora was born in New Delhi, India. He studied electrical and electronic engineering at Birla Institute of Technology and Science. Arora has an EMP from INSEAD, attended Executive Education at Harvard Business School, and holds a diploma in Sales and Marketing from the London Business School.

Career 
Samir Arora worked at Apple in Software and New Media from 1982 to 1991. Arora wrote a white paper called "Information Navigation: The Future of Computing" in late 1986 while working directly for the chairman and CEO of Apple, John Sculley. He left Apple to found the spin-off Rae Technology from Apple.

From 1992 to 1995, Arora was chairman and chief executive officer of Rae Technology. In 1995 Samir Arora co-founded NetObjects, Inc. and together with a design and development team including David Kleinberg, Clement Mok and his brother, Sal Arora, created NetObjects Fusion, one of the first Web design products that allowed Web sites to be designed, structured and created without programming.

In 1997, after the launch of NetObjects Fusion, IBM invested approximately $100 million in a share exchange to buy 80% of NetObjects, corresponding to a valuation of around $150 million. NetObjects, Inc. went public on NASDAQ in 1999 with IBM staying the majority shareholder. From June 2003 to February 2004, Arora served as chairman of the board of Tickle, Inc., one of the first social networking sites founded in 1999, and helped create a joint venture with Masayoshi Son at Softbank in Japan. Tickle was acquired by Monster.com in May 2004.

In 2003, Mode Media (formerly Project Y and then Glam Media), Inc. was formed by a number of people including Arora. Arora was the interim CEO of Glam Media from 2003 to 2005, and CEO from 2006 to 2016. For his work at Mode Media, Arora was included by MIN Magazine in the Digital Hot List 2008 and was named Web 2.0's Don Draper as one of the 30 men shaping our digital future by GQ Magazine  On June, 2017, a year and a half after the departure of Samir Arora and Marc Andreessen, Mode Media U.S. was acquired by BrideClick, who changed the company name to Glam, Inc. Mode Media continued its operations in International and in January, 2017 an investment group Montaro purchased Mode Media in Japan. In March, 2017 shareholders appointed Samir Arora as the executive chairman of Mode Media in Japan.

In April 2016, Samir Arora founded Sage Digital, a new AI verified experts platform startup and currently operates as its chief executive officer. Sage began with 100 manually curated experts and has grown to 250k experts and influencers and 5 million businesses.

In September 2021, Samir Arora founded Kyro Digital, one of the first native web3 multi–chain platforms and currently operates as its chief executive officer. Kyro added Peter Leeb, Darshana Munde, Liz Thompson, Arfat Allarakha and Muoi Lam as co-founders and the blockchain companies Avalanche (Blizzard), Polygon, Rally, Tezos and Kadena and venture funds Decasonic, Drive Capital, Fenbushi Capital, Information Capital, LLC, Signum Capital, UOB Venture Management, Woodside Incubator and Brad Koenig as investors.

Philanthropic 

Since February 2004, Arora has been the Chairman of International Zen Therapy Institute, a 501(c)(3) organization based in Honolulu, that was founded by Dub Leigh with Daihonzan Chozen-ji and currently serves as its President. 

In July 2020, Arora with Marcus Samuelsson, Derek Evens, and Brad Koenig created Project Bento Fund, a California nonprofit 501(c)(3) corporation to provides urgent support to restaurants, local, minority-owned, women-led and BIPIOC businesses and their employees most impacted by the COVID-19 pandemic, economic, racial and social crisis.

Books 
Arora was editor and publisher of the annual awards and book Foodie Top 100 Restaurants with contributing top food critics Patricia Wells, Ruth Reichl, Gael Greene, Masuhiro Yamamoto, Jonathan Gold, Bruno Verjus, Alexander Lobrano, Charles Campion, Vir Sanghvi, Aun Koh, Susumu Ohta, Kundo Koyama, Yuki Yamamura, Karen Brooks, Phil Vettel, Marie-Claude Lortie, Erika Lenkert and Diane Tapscott

References 

1965 births
Internet pioneers
Apple Inc. employees
American computer businesspeople
American venture capitalists
Living people
American software engineers
INSEAD alumni
Alumni of London Business School
Harvard Business School alumni
Silicon Valley people
Indian emigrants to the United States
American people of Indian descent